Canyon Springs High School can refer to: 
Canyon Springs High School (Caldwell, Idaho)
Canyon Springs High School (Moreno Valley, California)
Canyon Springs High School (North Las Vegas, Nevada)